William Cecil Russell (25 April 1866 – 9 May 1929) was an Australian-born English first-class cricketer.  Russell made a single first-class appearance for Hampshire against Yorkshire in 1898. Russell made seven runs in the match.

Russell died at Etchingham, Sussex on 9 May 1929.

External links
William Russell at Cricinfo
William Russell at CricketArchive

1866 births
1929 deaths
People from Victoria (Australia)
British people of Australian descent
English cricketers
Hampshire cricketers
People from Etchingham